= Gerson Adersbach =

German-Jewish poet

Gerson A. Adersbach (died 1823) was a German-Jewish poet. He belonged to the generation that, in the first quarter of the nineteenth century, took an active part in the struggle for Jewish emancipation. He published poetry in the Sulamith, including odes on the Jewish soldiers who fell in the Battle of Waterloo, and on William Wilberforce, the English abolitionist.
